The Iglesia y convento de la Recoleta Dominica is a church and convent in Recoleta, Santiago de Chile. The church and convent were declared as a National Monument in 1974.

History 
The construction of the first church began in 1750, in La Chimba, a district that was originally considered as not part of the city of Santiago, located immediately north of the Mapocho River.

By mid-1800s, the continuous increase of parishioners motivated the planning of a church ampliation and the improvement of its decoration. A new main altar was designed by Eusebio Chelli who, because of the high quality of the altar, was commissioned to design a new church.

The church was opened in 1882.

Architecture 
The church was inspired by the design of the Basilica of Saint Paul Outside the Walls. It features 60 Carrara marble columns.

References

Churches in Santiago, Chile
Roman Catholic churches in Chile